Kherwadi Vidhan Sabha seat was one of the seats in Maharashtra Legislative Assembly in India. It was made defunct after constituency map of India was redrawn in 2008.

Members of Vidhan Sabha

Election Results

1978 Assembly Election
 Ramdas Nayak (JNP) : 36,851 votes    
 Ahmed B.Zakaria (INC) : 17,834

1980 Assembly Election
 Chheda Meghaji (INC-I) : 21,765 votes    
 Ramdas Nayak (BJP) : 17861

2004 Assembly Election
 Chandurkar, Janardan Chandrappa (INC) : 50,157 votes  
 Prakash(Bala) Vasant Sawant (SHS) : 43609

See also 
 List of constituencies of Maharashtra Legislative Assembly

References 

Former assembly constituencies of Maharashtra